Kalanta Christougenon is a Greek traditional Christmas carol (kalanta) translated into English simply as "Christmas Carol." This carol is commonly abbreviated as Kalanta or Kalanda, some other common titles for this Christmas carol are Kalin Iméran and Christos Genate. This carol is commonly sung around Christmas and accompanied by light percussion instruments such as the Triangle (musical instrument) and Guitar.

This Greek traditional Christmas carol gained a large audience beyond Greece through various performances by Nana Mouskouri throughout Europe.

Lyrics

See also
 List of Christmas carols

Greek traditions
Christmas carols
Eastern Orthodox Christian culture